Garage is a biannual publication dedicated to contemporary art and fashion. It was founded by Dasha Zhukova in 2011.

Its name comes from the Garage Museum of Contemporary Art in Moscow, which Zhukova opened in 2008. A Russian-language edition of the magazine was launched in March 2013.

In July 2016, Garage Magazine became a wholly owned subsidiary of Brooklyn, New York-based Vice Media.

Staff
Garage was founded by Dasha Zhukova, formerly editor-in-chief of Pop, in 2011.

In October 2013, Charlotte Stockdale, formerly fashion director of i-D, was appointed as Garage's fashion director.

Mark Guiducci, formerly the Arts Editor of American Vogue, was named editor-in-chief in September 2017. Furtherore, After a difficult year for fashion media in which advertising revenues shrank in reaction to drops in consumer spending, Vice Media will soon stop publishing Garage.

Smartphone application
In 2014, Garage launched a smartphone application. By scanning certain pages of the magazine with the application, users are granted access to extra digital content. Scanning the front cover of Garage issue 7, released in September 2014, readers were able to view the first virtual sculpture created by Jeff Koons.

References

External links
 
 10 Garage

Biannual magazines published in the United Kingdom
Fashion magazines published in the United Kingdom
Magazines established in 2011
Magazines published in London
Vice Media
Visual arts magazines published in the United Kingdom